Victor Koo Wing Cheung or Gu Yongqiang served as President of Sohu, Inc., the second largest search engine in China.

He became the co-founder and CEO of Youku in 2006, which has been called the "YouTube of China".

Youku merged with Tudou in 2012, creating China's largest video platform.

Prior to the announcement of the merger, Youku was the #5 website in China, and Tudou was #4.

Koo has an estimated net worth of $1.1 billion.

Education
Koo attended and graduated from the University of California, Berkeley.

Net worth
Following the 2010 listing of Youku on the New York Stock Exchange, Koo is a billionaire.

Personal life

Koo was born in Hong Kong in 1966. His father is from Guangzhou and his mother is from Tianjin. He has one sister.

References

External links

Digital Giants: Victor Koo 12 March 2010 news.bbc.co.uk

Living people
1966 births
Hong Kong billionaires
Chinese chief executives
Chinese computer businesspeople
Chinese expatriates in the United States
Stanford Graduate School of Business alumni
University of California, Berkeley alumni
Hong Kong businesspeople
Sohu people
Alibaba Group people
Bain & Company employees
21st-century Chinese businesspeople